The MTV Europe Music Award for Best New Act is one of the four original general categories that have been given out since the first annual MTV Europe Music Awards in 1994. Originally called Breakthrough Artist (1994—1999), it was briefly retitled to Future Sounds in 2006 and the winner was chosen by their peers. In 2007 the category featured only European artists chosen by viewers in each region of Europe, every day the artist with the fewest votes was eliminated and the winner would play live at the EMAs. In 2008 the award was once again retitled, this time to its current name. The current holder by this award is Seventeen.

Winners and nominees
Winners are listed first and highlighted in bold.

† indicates an MTV Video Music Award for Best New Artist–winning artist.
‡ indicates an MTV Video Music Award for Best New Artist–nominated artist that same year.

1990s

2000s

2010s

2020s

See also
MTV Europe Music Award for Best Push Act
MTV Video Music Award for Best New Artist

References

MTV Europe Music Awards
Music awards for breakthrough artist